Dasht-e Dera Balverdi (also Romanized as Dasht-e Derā Balverdī; also known as Borj-e Dasht Darreh, Burj Dasht-i-Dera, Dasht Darā, and Dasht-e Derā) is a village in Mishan Rural District, Mahvarmilani District, Mamasani County, Fars Province, Iran. At the 2006 census, its population was 59, in 16 families.

References 

Populated places in Mamasani County